Baek Bong-ki (born December 16, 1980) is a South Korean actor. He is best known for his roles in the noir film Once Upon a Time in High School (2004) and the military sitcom Blue Tower.

Filmography

Film

Television series

Variety show

Music video

Theater

Discography

References

External links

1980 births
Living people
South Korean male television actors
South Korean male film actors
South Korean male web series actors
People from Daejeon
21st-century South Korean male actors